is a railway station located in the town of  Ōe, Yamagata Prefecture, Japan, operated by the East Japan Railway Company  (JR East)

Lines
Aterazawa Station is a terminus of the Aterazawa Line, and is located 24.3 rail kilometers from the opposing of the line at Kita-Yamagata Station.

Station layout
The station has a single side platform. The station has a Midori no Madoguchi staffed ticket office.

History
Aterazawa Station began operation on 24 April 1922. With the privatization of the JNR on 1 April 1987, the station came under the control of the East Japan Railway Company. A new station building was completed in 2002.

Passenger statistics
In fiscal 2018, the station was used by an average of 311 passengers daily (boarding passengers only).

Surrounding area

See also
List of Railway Stations in Japan

References

External links 

  Aterazawa Station (JR East) 

Railway stations in Yamagata Prefecture
Aterazawa Line
Railway stations in Japan opened in 1923
Ōe, Yamagata